"I'll Tumble 4 Ya"  was a hit single from Culture Club's Platinum-plus debut album Kissing to Be Clever.

The 7" single was released only in North America, peaking at #9 in the U.S. and #5 in Canada. In Australia, it was released in September 1983 as a Double A-side single with "Karma Chameleon", peaking at #1 and receiving substantial airplay.  With this single, in America, Culture Club was the first band to have three Top 10 singles from a debut album since the Beatles.  Much like the group's two prior American hits, this song was aided by a hugely popular MTV music video.

Cash Box called the song "an up tempo percussive dance number with none of the overbearing production gimmicks of competing new music groups" and praised the horn parts.

Track listing
Canada 7" vinyl
 A. "I'll Tumble 4 Ya" – 2:32
 B. "Man Shake" – 2:34

USA 7" vinyl
 A. "I'll Tumble 4 Ya" – 2:32
 B. "Mystery Boy"

USA 12" vinyl
 A. "I'll Tumble 4 Ya" (12") – 4:38
 B. "Man Shake" – 2:34

Official versions
 "I'll Tumble 4 Ya" (7") – 2:36
 "I'll Tumble 4 Ya" (U.S. 12" Remix) – 4:38
 "I'll Tumble 4 Ya" (VH1 Storytellers Live)

Chart positions
U.S. Billboard Hot 100: #9
Canadian Singles Charts: #9 
U.S. Hot Dance Club Play: #14
U.S. Adult Contemporary: #33

References

Culture Club songs
1983 singles
1982 songs
Virgin Records singles
Songs written by Boy George
Songs written by Roy Hay (musician)
Songs written by Mikey Craig
Songs written by Jon Moss